Brygmophyseter, known as the biting sperm whale, is an extinct genus of toothed whale in the sperm whale family with one species, B. shigensis. When it was first described in 1994, the species was placed in the genus Scaldicetus based on tooth morphology, but this was later revised in 1995. In 2006, it was classified into the genus Naganocetus, which is considered to be a junior synonym. The only known specimen, a nearly complete skeleton, was dated to be around 15–14 million years old. Brygmophyseter is part of a group of macroraptorial sperm whales (often shortened to "raptorial") which tended to be apex predators using their large teeth to catch struggling prey such as whales. It had a spermaceti organ which was probably used for biosonar like in the modern sperm whale. The whale has made an appearance on The History Channel's TV series Jurassic Fight Club.

History of discovery
The holotype specimen, SFM-0001, was excavated from the Bessho Formation in the Nagano Prefecture in Japan in 1988 by the residents of Shiga-mura with assistance from the staff of the Shiga Fossil Museum. The specimen is nearly complete, and consists of a partial skull, the jawbone, the lingual bone in the neck, vertebrae, ribs, the breastbone, and humeri and radii in the limbs. It was dated to the Langhian stage of the Miocene 14–15 million years ago (mya), and the specimen is currently on display at the Gunma Museum of Natural History in Japan.

The genus name is a combination of the Ancient Greek word brygmos, which means "biting" or "gnashing", combined with physeter, which is the generic name of the living sperm whale, and also means "blower" in Ancient Greek. The junior synonym Naganocetus derives from the Nagano Prefecture and the Latin cetus meaning "whale".

Description

Like other raptorials, Brygmophyseter had enamel-coated teeth in both jaws, unlike the modern sperm whale (Physeter macrocephalus). It probably had 11 or 12 teeth in each jaw, though no upper teeth were preserved in the holotype. The brow ridge was broad and flat-topped, and the zygomatic process of the squamosal bone on the cheeks was large and robust. The temporal fossa on the sides of the skull were elongated, which may have been plesiomorphic features from archaeocetes, that is, it is an ancestral characteristic of the whale. The right nasal passage was small and was asymmetrical with the left nasal passage, like in the modern sperm whale. Characteristic of sperm whales, it had a deep basin on the top of its skull, known as the supracranial basin. Like in the modern sperm whale, this basin probably held the spermaceti organ, and so the whale had biosonar capabilities. The nuchal crest which is the part of the whale skull which projects upwards on the back end of the skull, behind the supracranial basin, was low and broad. Similar to modern-day toothed whales, but unlike in the modern sperm whale, the shoulder blades were thicker than they were tall.

The holotype had preserved zero neck vertebrae, ten thoracic vertebrae, ten lumbar vertebrae, and fifteen tail vertebrae. In comparison, the modern sperm whale has eleven thoracic, eight lumbar, and twenty-two tail vertebrae, and the smaller tail in Brygmophyseter is probably a primitive characteristic. The vertebra segments increase in height until the seventh lumbar vertebra, then they begin to decrease. In the thoracic vertebrae, with the exception of the tenth one, the width of the segments is larger than the height. The lumbar and tail vertebrae are circular in shape.

The head of the humerus arm bone of Brygmophyseter was positioned perpendicular to the shaft. The elbow joint on the humerus was not distinct from the ulna, typical in cetaceans. The ulna was more primitive than that of the modern sperm whale, in that the shaft was longer and more slender, and the head of the bone was smaller.

Paleoecology

Since Brygmophyseter was a raptorial, and the group is characterized by their adaptations for subduing large prey, Brygmophyseter was likely a macropredator of marine mammals and other large marine vertebrates, occupying a niche similar to the killer whale. Though no stomach remains or bite marks have been found, it is thought to have preyed upon a variety of animals, including whales, seals, fish, and cephalopods.

Brygmophyseter was discovered in the Middle Miocene deposits of the Bessho Formation of Japan, which has also yielded some of the earliest oceanic dolphins and rorqual baleen whales, as well as beaked whale remains. Also found were fossil plants, echinoderms, cephalopods, deep-sea teleost fish, and seabirds. The shark remains discovered in this formation belong to the sandbar shark (Carcharhinus plumbeus) and other unidentified Carcharhinus sharks, the seal shark (Dalatias licha), the extinct broad-toothed mako (Isurus hastalis), the extinct hook-tooth mako (Isurus planus), the Japanese velvet dogfish (Scymnodon ichiharai), and a species of Etmopterus lantern shark.

Taxonomy

Phylogeny

Brygmophyseter is a member of a fossil stem group of hyper-predatory macroraptorial sperm whales from the Miocene (often shortened to "raptorial"). The other members are Acrophyseter, Albicetus, Livyatan, and Zygophyseter, and these five whales have in common enamel-coated teeth in both the upper and lower jaws which were used in hunting large prey. These teeth are thought to have evolved in either a basilosaurid-like common ancestor, or multiple times independently in the group. Brygmophyseter is the oldest raptorial. It has been proposed that these raptorials be placed into the extinct paraphyletic (hence, probably invalid) subfamily Hoplocetinae, alongside Scaldicetus, Diaphorocetus, Idiorophus, and Hoplocetus.

The species was first described in 1994 by paleontologists Kiyoharu Hirota and Lawrence Barnes. Observing the teeth which were present in both jaws and coated in enamel, they had placed it into the genus Scaldicetus which was described in 1867 as having similar characteristics. However, a 1995 study stated that since Scaldicetus is described only from tooth remains and is likely a wastebasket taxon, new species should not be assigned to the genus. Therefore, the study authored by paleontologists Kimura Toshiyuki, Hasegawa Yoshikazu, and Barnes Lawrence placed it into the newly erected genus Brygmophyseter. A 2006 study by geologists Giovanni Bianucci and Walter Landini placed the whale into the genus Naganocetus which they had created, and concluded that it was most closely related to Zygophyseter, which they had for the first time described in the same study. This was justified by their similar body sizes, the basin containing the spermaceti organ (the supracranial basin) not extending forward (causing a convex snout), and the presence of long temporal fossae on the sides of the skull. However, since Brygmophyseter was published first, Naganocetus is considered to be a junior synonym.

In fiction
Brygmophyseter was featured in the fifth episode of The History Channel's Jurassic Fight Club, "Deep Sea Killers". In this episode, Brygmophyseter, which was referred to as the "biting sperm whale," was portrayed as being able to weaponize sonar in order to stun prey, and to have traveled in pods like the modern-day killer whale. The pod was attacked by a megalodon, which seemingly had a similar size to the whales. When the megalodon severely wounded one of the members of the pod, the rest of the whales teamed up to drive the megalodon off. Once the member of the pod died, however, the megalodon returned to feed on it.

See also

 Evolution of cetaceans
 List of extinct cetaceans

References

External links

 Brygmophyseter Skeleton on display in a Japanese Museum
 Brygmophyseter, ancient killer sperm whale
 Age of Mammals – Specimen Spotlight – Aulophyseter morricei

Miocene cetaceans
Miocene mammals of Asia
Prehistoric toothed whales
Sperm whales
Prehistoric monotypic mammal genera
Prehistoric cetacean genera
Fossil taxa described in 2006
Fossils of Japan